Prisma is a photo-editing mobile application that uses neural networks and artificial intelligence to apply artistic effects to transform images.

The app was created by Alexey Moiseenkov, Oleg Poyaganov, Ilya Frolov, Andrey Usoltsev, and Aram Hardy. It was launched in June 2016 as a free mobile app. It debuted on iOS on Apple App Store during the first week of June and it became the leading app at the App Store in Russia and other neighboring countries. A week after its launch, the app received over 7.5 million downloads. It had over 1 million active users as of July 2016. On 19 July, 2016, the developer launched a beta version of the app for Android, which the developers closed a few hours later after receiving feedback from users. This version was released publicly on 24 July, 2016 on Google Play.

In July 2016, the developer announced a video and virtual reality version of the app was  under development.

On 7 July, 2017, Prisma launched a new app called Sticky which turns selfies into stickers for sharing to social feeds.

History
The app was created by the team led by Alexey Moiseenkov who also founded the Prisma Labs, based in Sunnyvale, California. Moiseenkov previously worked at Mail.Ru and later resigned from his job to dedicate his time to the development of the app. He has said that the development of the app took one and a half months and the team did not do anything to promote the app.

The algorithm that powers the app is based on the open source programming and algorithms behind DeepArt.

Features

Users can upload pictures and select a variety of filters to transform the picture with an artistic effect. At launch, the app offered twenty different filters. Additional filters are added daily. In July 2016, Moiseenkov stated that the app will offer forty filters by the end of the month.

The image rendering takes place in Prisma Labs' servers and uses a neural network with artificial intelligence to add the artistic effect. The result is delivered back to the user's phone. Unlike other photo editing apps, Prisma renders the image by going through different layers and recreating the image rather than inserting a layer over the image.

In August 2016, the iOS version of the app was updated to edit image offline by utilizing the phone's processor for image rendering.

Reception

Downloads
One week after its debut on iOS App Store, the app was downloaded over 7.5 million times and received over 1 million active users. It also became the top listed app in Russia and its neighboring countries. In the end of July 2016, it was installed over 12.5 million devices with over 1.5 million active users worldwide. According to App Annie, it was listed in the top 10 apps on the App Store in 77 different countries.

On the first day of the Android version release, it received over 1.7 million downloads with 50 million pictures processed by the app.

Research and technology
AN research machine learning conference: Neural Information Processing Systems (NIPS) in 2015. The technology is an example of a Neural Style Transfer algorithm.  This technology used in Prisma was developed independently and before Prisma, and both the university and the company have no affiliation with one another. 

Further recent work developed by Stanford University, titled Perceptual Losses for Real-Time Style Transfer and Super-Resolution by Justin Johnson, Alexandre Alahi and Li Fei-Fei, has also been able to create real-time style transfer through video.

The code for the previous papers is available at no charge at GitHub for research purposes.

See also 
Animaker
DeepArt
List of Prisma (app) filters
Prequel (mobile application)

References

External links
 
 
2016 software
Mobile software
Photo software
Video software
IOS software
Android (operating system) software
Deep learning software applications